Phillip Gaimon (born January 28, 1986) is a former American professional road racing cyclist, who rode professionally between 2009 and 2016. He is currently part of Jukebox Cycling, a multi-discipline team of six riders. He began his racing career while attending the University of Florida and competed in collegiate races as part of the University's Cycling Club. A noted blogger, Gaimon has written for VeloNews; he formerly posted at Bicycling, ESPN, and Sports Illustrated.

Career
Gaimon was born in Columbus, Ohio, United States and spent his adolescence in Atlanta. , Gaimon resides in Los Angeles, United States.

Gaimon won his very first race with his new team, stage 1 of the 2014 Tour de San Luis, and managed to hold on throughout the race to finish second overall, behind Nairo Quintana, who claimed the leader's jersey during an individual time trial. Gaimon announced his retirement at the end of 2016. In June 2019, while training for the 2020 Olympics in the Team pursuit, Gaimon suffered a serious crash breaking his collarbone, scapula, 5 ribs, and partially collapsing a lung.

Gaimon began authoring books during his professional career, including Pro Cycling on $10 a Day: From Fat Kid to Euro Pro, which was released in 2014 by VeloPress. He continued writing in retirement, including 2017's Ask a Pro: Deep Thoughts and Unreliable Advice from America's Foremost Cycling Sage (also published by VeloPress) and Draft Animals: Living the Pro Cycling Dream (Once in a While) released by Penguin Books. Gaimon also hosts a weekly podcast called The Peloton Brief and an annual charity event ride in Simi Valley, California called Phil's Cookie Fondo.

Gaimon is vocal about performing without performance-enhancing drugs, and commissioned a tattoo of a bar of soap with the word "CLEAN" on his right bicep. Since retiring from participating in professional event brands, Gaimon has generated social media engagement by attempting to beat "king-of-the-mountain" (KOM) records on the digital app Strava. He also has created a video series called "Worst Retirement Ever" of his KOM attempts on YouTube.

In 2022 Gaimon became part of the newly formed Jukebox Cycling team.

Major results
Sources:

2006
 8th Overall Tour of the Bahamas
2007
 7th Univest Grand Prix
1st  Youth classification
2008
 1st Mount Washington Hillclimb
2009
 1st Mount Washington Hillclimb
2010
 2nd Overall Tour de Taiwan
2011
 6th Overall Tour de Beauce
 8th Overall Cascade Cycling Classic
2012
 1st  Overall Redlands Bicycle Classic
1st Stage 1 (ITT)
 4th Overall Cascade Cycling Classic
2013
 2nd Overall Tour of the Gila
 6th Overall Cascade Cycling Classic
1st Stage 1
2014
 2nd Overall Tour de San Luis
1st Stage 1
2015
 1st  Overall Redlands Bicycle Classic
2017
 1st USA Cycling Hill Climb National Championship 
 1st Mount Washington Hillclimb
2022
 1st Overall (with new official record of 50:38) Mount Washington Hillclimb

Bibliography

References

External links

 

https://www.velonews.com/2012/08/rider-journal/phil-gaimon-diary-florida-takes-grassroots-steps-against-amateur-and-masters-doping_232960
http://stevetilford.com/2016/12/05/phil-gaimons-strava-kom-cleansing/
http://www.cyclingnews.com/news/retired-gaimon-goes-to-work-toppling-doping-tainted-strava-koms/
https://abovecategorycycling.com/blogs/journal/kom-hunter-the-worst-retirement-ever
 Team profile
 VeloPress profile
 Pro Cycling on $10 a Day
https://www.cyclingweekly.com/news/racing/phil-gaimons-kom-hunting-youtube-makes-fascinating-viewing-322652
https://cyclingtips.com/2016/12/gaimon-begins-retirement-by-hunting-banned-riders-strava-koms/
https://road.cc/content/news/220212-video-phil-gaimons-new-hobby-collecting-strava-koms-and-he-targets-those-held

Living people
American male cyclists
1986 births
People from Studio City, Los Angeles